Eriochilus helonomos, commonly known as the swamp bunny orchid, is a plant in the orchid family Orchidaceae and is endemic to Western Australia. It has a single pointed leaf and usually a single white or cream-coloured flower with reddish brown markings. A relatively common species, it usually grows in swampy places. It is distinguished from other bunny orchids by the arrangement of its petals.

Description
Unlike others in the genus the petals are pressed against the sides of the column. It has scattered clusters of dark red and white hairs. Flowering occurs from April to July.

Taxonomy and naming
Eriochilus helonomos was first formally described in 2006 by Stephen Hopper and Andrew Brown from a specimen collected near Denmark and the description was published in Nuytsia. The specific epithet (helonomos) is derived from an Ancient Greek word meaning "living in marshes", referring to the usual habitat of this species.

Distribution and habitat
The swamp bunny orchid grows in swampy places and in seepage areas on granite outcrops. It is found between Dongara and Cape Riche.

References

helonomos
Orchids of Western Australia
Endemic orchids of Australia
Plants described in 2006
Endemic flora of Western Australia
Taxa named by Stephen Hopper